Yat Sen (Pinyin: Yi Xian), named after the founding father Dr. Sun Yat-sen of the Republic of China and completed in 1931, was a light cruiser— having more in common with the small cruisers of pre–World War I era—in the ROC Navy before World War II. An enlarged design was laid down but never completed due to the Japanese occupation of Kiangnan shipyard.

Service record
Yat Sen was launched and began its sea trials in 1931. On August 5, 1933,Yat Sen received orders to move to the Bohai Sea for patrolling missions. Yat Sen later headed to Fujian when the 19th Route Army rebelled there. In 1936, Yat Sen was ordered to keep a close eye on Japanese ships drilling near Fuzhou and showed a strong mobility on the sea during the progress.
Yat Sen was sunk as well on 25 September 1937 after shooting down two of the 16 attacking aircraft, losing 14 of its crew.

The Japanese salvaged the ship after the fall of Kiangyin Fortress. After having its stern deck added by one level and receiving radar, sonar, and Japanese weapons, it was renamed  and employed as a training ship for naval academy cadets destined for submarine service. It survived World War II and was returned to its former owner on 9 August 1946.  Before its departure, however, the Japanese installed all the German-made wooden furniture taken from the armored cruiser  (which by then had been sold for scrapping) into its cabins.

After reverting to its old name (逸仙) and rejoining the ROCN, Yat Sen / Yi Xian remained active during the Chinese Civil War and the ROC government's subsequent withdrawal to Taiwan. It participated in numerous patrol cruises but was not involved in any major action until being decommissioned on 1 June 1958 and sold for scrapping on 19 May the following year.

External links 

 
 

Cruisers of the Republic of China Navy
Ships built in China
1931 ships
Second Sino-Japanese War cruisers of China
World War II naval ships of China
World War II naval ships of Japan
Cruisers sunk by aircraft
Ships sunk by Japanese aircraft
Naval ships of the Republic of China captured by Japan during World War II